The Shish is a river in the Omsk Oblast of Russia. It is a right tributary of the Irtysh. It is 378 km long with a basin area of 5,270 km². The Shish usually freezes by early November and the ice breaks up by the end of April.

Notes

External links
 "Шиш" ("Shish") Большая Советская Энциклопедия (The Great Soviet Encyclopedia), in Russian
 "река Шиш" ("river Shish") Омская область на карте (Omsk Oblast in Maps), photographs of the Shish River, in Russian

Rivers of Omsk Oblast